Michael Stadnyk (born August 8, 1986) is a former professional Canadian football defensive end. He was a member of the Saskatchewan Roughriders, Calgary Stampeders and Edmonton Eskimos of the Canadian Football League. He was drafted by the Roughriders in the second round of the 2008 CFL Draft. He played college football for Montana Grizzlies.

External links
Saskatchewan Roughriders bio

1986 births
Living people
Calgary Stampeders players
Canadian football defensive linemen
Edmonton Elks players
Montana Grizzlies football players
Sportspeople from Regina, Saskatchewan
Players of Canadian football from Saskatchewan
Saskatchewan Roughriders players